502 may refer to:

502, a year
502 (number), a number
Area code 502, a North American telephone area code in northern central Kentucky, including Louisville
List of highways numbered 502
"502" (song), by Megadeth
"502", a song by Marduk on the album Panzer Division Marduk about the 502nd Heavy Panzer Battalion.
HTTP 502, the HTTP error response status for "Bad Gateway"

See also
502nd (disambiguation)